Ebac Ltd is a family-owned British company which designs and manufactures dehumidifiers, water coolers, air source heat pumps, freezers and washing machines.

Company history
In 1972, John Elliott took an order from Bovis to build industrial dehumidifiers suited to the UK climate. That order led to Ebac's foundation in 1973, with Elliott as the sole member of staff. The company grew and seven years later it reached its first million pound turnover. In 1980, Ebac developed the UK's first mass-produced domestic dehumidifier. Ebac moved into the water cooler market in 1993.

In 2005, Ebac moved into the leisure industry by opening its first city centre luxury day spa for ladies. The spa is situated in Brewery Wharf, Leeds, and its aim is to combine luxury, pampering, beauty and indulgence in a convenient city centre location. Waterfall Spa has also developed its own range of spa retail products. The spa can accommodate up to 30 guests per day and the facilities include six treatment rooms, relaxation boudoir, hydrotherapy pool, tropicarium, aromatherapy steam room, rasul mud chamber, manicure and pedicure area and café. In 2008, a local newspaper (The Yorkshire Post) reported that a number of celebrities often frequented the spa. However in 2010 it ceased trading.

A range of refrigerators and freezers was introduced in 2008, but were discontinued a few years later due to being imported and merely badged as Ebac.

In 2011, Ebac began to develop a range of air source heat pumps, but again were discontinued some years later. Also in 2011, ownership of Ebac was transferred to a trust which restricts the sale or breakup of the company and requires the reinvestment of all profits.

In 2013, Ebac purchased the assets of the collapsed Scotland-based company Icetech Freezers, including its Norfrost brand. In 2014 it began production of Norfrost branded freezers at its own factory, but by early 2016 Ebac once again ceased production of the chest freezers.

Ebac started production of washing machines in 2016. It became the first manufacturer of washing machines in the UK since the closure of the Hotpoint/Indesit factory in Denbighshire in 2009. The project was assisted by a government grant received in 2013 and was expected to create 200 jobs. Sadly, this number of jobs was not realised and never reached significant job numbers hoped.
Production of their washing machines are limited in volume and only sold on the UK mainland. However reviews of their washing machines appear very favourable ranking highly on both quality and reliability.

John Elliott 
John Elliott was born in Bishop Auckland and trained as an engineer. His father was a baker who died when Elliott was six months old. Elliot grew up in High Lands, a Durham pit village near Cockfield.

In 2004, John Elliott (Founder and Chairman of Ebac), became the Chairman of the 'North East Says No' campaign which was set up to stop Deputy Prime Minister John Prescott's plans for a regional assembly. The campaign was a huge success with 78% of voters saying No. John has since made a number of TV appearances including Channel 4's Secret Millionaire [Series 1:Episode 2] and the very first episode of the BBC comedy documentary 'Bring Your Husband To Heel'.

References

External links 
 ebacgroup.com Ebac Group

Manufacturing companies of the United Kingdom
Companies based in County Durham
Home appliance manufacturers of the United Kingdom
English brands